Rafinesquia californica is a species of flowering plant in the family Asteraceae known by the common names California chicory and California plumeseed. It looks like a weedy daisy, bearing heads of elegant white-petaled flowers. The ligules of the flowers are often striped with lavender or pink on the undersides, a feature most noticeable when the heads are closed. Each fruit has a pappus of stiff white or light brown hairs.

It is among the first plants to sprout up in areas recently cleared by fire. Indeed, the seeds germinate more readily in the presence of burned wood. It is native to most of the southwestern United States as far north as Oregon, and to Baja California in Mexico.

References

External links
Calflora Database: Rafinesquia californica (California chicory,  California plumseed)
[cjeps.berkeley.edu/eflora/eflora_display.php?tid=4548 Jepson Manual eFlora (TJM2) treatment of Rafinesquia californica]
USDA Plants Profile for Rafinesquia californica (California plumeseed)
Flora of North America
UC Photos gallery of Rafinesquia californica

Cichorieae
Flora of California
Flora of Baja California
Flora of Oregon
Flora of the Southwestern United States
Natural history of the California chaparral and woodlands
Natural history of the California Coast Ranges
Natural history of the Channel Islands of California
Natural history of the Peninsular Ranges
Natural history of the San Francisco Bay Area
Natural history of the Santa Monica Mountains
Natural history of the Transverse Ranges
Taxa named by Thomas Nuttall
Flora without expected TNC conservation status